The Waltham Forest Cello Fest is a cello festival based in the London Borough of Waltham Forest, north-east London.

History 

Festival was created in 2019 as a cello celebration of the communities in Waltham Forest the first ever Mayor's London Borough of Culture. The WFCF was supported by Make It Happen - London Borough of Waltham Forest.

2019 

The 1st Waltham Forest Cello Fest commemorated the 334th anniversary of the birth of Johann Sebastian Bach, the 327th anniversary of the birth if Italian baroque composer Giuseppe Tartini, the 200th anniversary of the birth of German - French composer and cellist Jacques Offenbach, the 100th anniversary of the birth of Jewish composer Gideon Klein - Gideon Klein Centenary, the 100th anniversary of the birth of American Jazz Cellist Fred Katz - Fred Katz Centenary, the 60th anniversary of the death of Swiss-born American composer Ernest Bloch and London's first ever Borough of Culture in 2019!

2020 

The 2nd Waltham Forest Cello Fest scheduled many cello events to commemorate the 335th anniversary of the birth of Johann Sebastian Bach, the 250th anniversary of the birth of Ludwig van Beethoven, the 250th anniversary of the death of Italian baroque composer Giuseppe Tartini, the 175th anniversary of the birth of French composer Gabriel Fauré, the 140th anniversary of the birth of Swiss - American composer Ernest Bloch, the 140th anniversary of the death of French - German composer Jacques Offenbach, the 140th anniversary of the birth of Jewish composer James Simon, the 100th anniversary of the birth of Armenian composer Alexander Arutjunjan, Make Music Day 2020 and St David's Day.

2021 

The 3rd Waltham Forest Cello fest in London was held mainly online, featuring WFCF Cello Concerts, Underground Lunchtime Recitals (in the historic Victoria Line carriage), Cello Weekend, Make Music Day and Cello Academy. In 2021 festival commemorated the 121st anniversary of the birth of Jiří Weil (1900 - 1959), 211th anniversary of the birth of poet Karel Hynek Mácha (1810 - 1836) and the 336th anniversary of the birth of Johann Sebastian Bach. The WFCF 2021 featured cellists and young promising cello talents from Belgium, China, the Czech Republic, France, Israel, Italy, the UK and the USA.

Artists 

Musicians who have appeared include cellists Anna Brikciusová, František Brikcius, Yiqi Chen, Mira Kardan, Stijn Kuppens, Anna Shuttleworth (1927-2021), Duo Brikcius and George Wolfe-McGuire. Together with cellist, Cello Museum founder and curator Brenda Neece, cellist, researcher and guest curator Erica Lessie, conductor and composer Peter Askim, percussionist Brecht Claesen, violinist and philosopher Hugh Desmond, organist and composer Irena Kosíková, violinist and conductor Jan Talich, Talich Chamber Orchestra, soprano Nofar Yacobi and narrator Jan Židlický.

Venues 

Concerts were held in The London Borough of Waltham Forest

 the Engine House - Walthamstow Wetlands
 historic Victoria Line Carriage - Walthamstow Pumphouse Museum
 One Hoe Street in Walthamstow
 Church of St John the Baptist in Leytonstone
 Church of St Michael and All Angels in Walthamstow
 the Parish Church of Ss Peter and Paul in Chingford
 and online.

References

External links 
 Official website
 Borough of Culture: Cello Fest Two Siblings
 London Cello Society: The 3rd WALTHAM FOREST CELLO FEST 2021 in London
 BCSA: the 7th Underground Lunchtime Recital
 Czech Centre London: František Brikcius, Anna Brikciusová and Irena Kosíková at Waltham Forest Cello Fest
 The Strad: Waltham Forest Cello Fest 2021

Classical music festivals in England
Music festivals in London
Music festivals established in 2019